Gunlock State Park is a state park of Utah, USA, adjoining a  reservoir. The reservoir dam was constructed in 1970 for irrigation water and flood control.

Gunlock State Park is a primitive area; there are facilities.  The park offers camping, swimming, boating, and fishing.  The park and reservoir are named after the nearby community of Gunlock.  The town was named after William "Gunlock Will" Hamblin, its first settler.  Hamblin was a Mormon pioneer born in Ohio who settled in the area in 1857. Gunlock Will was a good hunter and sharpshooter, and was skillful in repairing gunlocks, which are the firing mechanisms for muzzleloaders.

The county road to the park is the Old Spanish Trail used by horsemen and raiders from Santa Fe, New Mexico to Los Angeles, California from the 1820s until 1849, when the gold fields of California became the destination and a shorter route was taken.

References

External links
 Gunlock State Park

Protected areas established in 1970
State parks of Utah
Protected areas of Washington County, Utah
1970 establishments in Utah